Jung is a locality in the northern Wimmera region, north-west Victoria. It is 316 km north-west of Melbourne and 18 km north-east of Horsham.

The name is derived from the Parish Jung Jung, which comes from an Aboriginal expression of uncertain meaning. It was previously known as Taylor’s Creek, Green Hills and Jerro. Originally Jung was a settlement on the Yarriambiack Creek, 3 km north of its present location, until 1879 when it moved towards the newly built railway station on the line between Stawell and Horsham.

In 2012 Jung's status was downgraded from a town to a gazetted locality.

References

Towns in Victoria (Australia)
Rural City of Horsham
Wimmera